Walter Fred Leverenz (July 21, 1888 – March 19, 1973) was a Major League Baseball pitcher.

References

1888 births
1973 deaths
St. Louis Browns players
Major League Baseball pitchers
Baseball players from Chicago
Worcester Busters players
Hartford Senators players
Los Angeles Angels (minor league) players
Indianapolis Indians players
Oakland Oaks (baseball) players
Rochester Hustlers players
Salt Lake City Bees players
Portland Beavers players
Buffalo Bisons (minor league) players
Toronto Maple Leafs (International League) players
Reading Keystones players